红山 may refer to:
Hong Shan (Pinyin : Hóng Shān, Red Mountain), an inner city mountain in Ürümqi, Xinjiang Uyghur Autonomous Region, China
 Bukit Merah, a hill in Singapore
 Taman Perdana, a location in the center of Batu Pahat Town, Johor, Malaysia
 Kizilto, Akto County, Kizilsu Kyrgyz Autonomous Prefecture, Xinjiang, China

See also
 Red Mountain (disambiguation)